The 1924 season of the Paraguayan Primera División, the top category of Paraguayan football, was played by 11 teams. The national champions were Nacional.

Results

Standings

External links
Paraguay 1924 season at RSSSF

Paraguayan Primera División seasons
Para
1